Juan Caballero can refer to:

 Juan Caballero (field hockey)
 Juan Caballero (footballer)